Joseph Francis Lintzenich (March 26, 1908 – June 23, 1985) was a professional American football player for the Chicago Bears of the National Football League (NFL). He also played for the St. Louis Gunners in 1932, prior to the club's entry into the NFL. Prior to that he was an assistant coach, under Garland Grange, for the St. Louis Veterans. On November 16, 1931, against the New York Giants, Lintzenich tied Wilbur Henry's NFL record by kicking a 94-yard punt. He shared that record with Henry until it was broken by Steve O'Neal of the New York Jets, who kicked a 98-yard punt on September 29, 1969, against the Denver Broncos.

Lintzenich played college football for Saint Louis University. He was inducted into the school's athletic hall of fame in 1976.

Lintzenich was the father-in-law of broadcaster Jack Buck and grandfather and namesake to Fox Sports broadcaster Joe Buck.

References

1908 births
1985 deaths
American football halfbacks
Chicago Bears players
Saint Louis Billikens football players
St. Louis Gunners players
People from Webster Groves, Missouri
Sportspeople from St. Louis County, Missouri
Players of American football from Missouri